800 Two Lap Runners is a 1994 Japanese film directed by Ryūichi Hiroki starring Shunsuke Matsuoka and Eugene Nomura. For director Hiroki, the film marks a transition from his early work in pink film to mainstream cinema.

Plot
This coming-of-age story revolves around two young long distance runners, Kenji Hirose and Ryuji Nakazawa. Kenji, haunted by memories of his dead friend Aihara with whom he had a brief homosexual affair, is now dating Aihara's former girlfriend Kyoko, but Kyoko is more interested in Kenji than he is in her. Ryuji, Kenji's friend and track rival, is pursuing hurdler Shoko but she in turn is after Kenji. Ryuji does have his own admirer, Nao, Kenji's younger sister, but when they do get together, Nao resembles her brother too much for Ryuji to go through with the lovemaking.

Cast
  as Kenji Hirose
  as Ryuji Nakazawa
  as Shoko Ida
  as Kyoko Yamaguchi
  as Nao Hirose
  as Aihara
  as Tomomi Ogawa
  as Shunichi Saitō

Release
800 Two Lap Runners was screened at the Berlin International Film Festival in the "Panorama" section in February 1994 before its theatrical release in Japan on July 9, 1994, by Herald Ace. It was released on DVD in Japan by Pioneer LDC on May 24, 2002.

Reception
Kinema Junpo magazine placed the film at number 7 in its list of the ten best Japanese films of 1994.  At the 16th Yokohama Film Festival held in January 1995, 800 Two Lap Runners was listed as the fourth best film of 1994 and actor Shunsuke Matsuoka was given one of the Best New Talent Awards. The film also took two awards at the 49th annual Mainichi Film Awards, Eugene Nomura for Best New Talent and Naoki Kayano for Cinematography.

References

External links
 
 

Japanese romantic drama films
1994 films
1990s Japanese-language films
Films directed by Ryūichi Hiroki
Films based on Japanese novels

ja:800 (小説)#映画